The Very Best of Cilla Black may refer to:
 The Very Best of Cilla Black (2013 album)
 The Very Best of Cilla Black (1983 album)